Tamara Adele Lund-Ioniță (6 January 1941 – 21 July 2005) was a Finnish soprano singer and actress. She was born in Turku and was a graduate of the Sibelius Academy. She performed in the Finnish National Opera from 1967 and at the Staatstheater am Gärtnerplatz in Munich from 1974 to 1987. Tamara Lund was the mother of the Finnish singer Maria Lund. Her second spouse was the Romanian opera singer Alexandru Ioniță. Tamara Lund died of stomach cancer in Turku in July 2005.

Discography 
Tamara Lund (1965)
Marco Bakker in Wenen (1975)
Mä elän (1977)
Sinun omasi (1983)
Rakkauden siivin (1990)
Tamara ja Alexandru slaavilaistunnelmissa (1990, with Alexandru Ioniță)
Pustan säveliä (1992)

Filmography 
Kun tuomi kukkii (1962)
Villin Pohjolan kulta (1963)
Leikkikalugangsteri (1969)
The Marvellous Adventures of a TV Man (1969)
Headquarters (1970)

References

External links 
Works of Tamara Lund Katalog der Deutschen Nationalbibliothek (in German)

1941 births
2005 deaths
Musicians from Turku
Finnish people of Russian descent
Finnish operatic sopranos
Finnish film actresses
Sibelius Academy alumni
Deaths from cancer in Finland
Deaths from stomach cancer
20th-century Finnish women opera singers